The Building at 52 Main Street is a historic triple decker residence in Southbridge, Massachusetts.  Built early in the 20th century, it is a good example of period worker housing with French Canadian immigrant design features.  The house was listed on the National Register of Historic Places in 1989.

Description and history
52 Main Street is located east of downtown Southbridge, on the north side of Main Street between Maple and Crystal Streets.  It was built during a housing boom brought about by the success of the nearby American Optical Company, during which larger house lots on Main Street were subdivided and built on with this type of worker housing.  In this instance, the present three-story building was built as a replacement for an older two-family residence.  This building is of wood frame construction, with a clapboarded exterior and low-pitch gable roof, and is set on a brick foundation.  Its network of exterior porches is a locally distinctive feature brought by French Canadian immigrants, wrapping around two sides of the house and sheltering staircases that provide outside access to the upper level residential units.  These types of porches are commonly found on surviving triple deckers of the first two decades of the 20th century.  The porch railings were originally in the more delicately featured Queen Anne style, with turned posts bracketed at their tops and spindled balusters, but those have been replaced by square posts and balusters.

See also
National Register of Historic Places listings in Southbridge, Massachusetts
National Register of Historic Places listings in Worcester County, Massachusetts

References

Buildings and structures in Southbridge, Massachusetts
Apartment buildings on the National Register of Historic Places in Massachusetts
Queen Anne architecture in Massachusetts
Buildings and structures completed in 1904
National Register of Historic Places in Southbridge, Massachusetts